West central El Paso is part of the city of El Paso, Texas, USA. The area is located north of Interstate 10 and west of the Franklin Mountains. The University of Texas at El Paso is located in the heart of the area. It is part of the El Paso Independent School District.

Neighborhoods
Here is a list of some of the neighborhoods in west central El Paso:

 Buena Vista
 Courchesne
 Crazy Cat Mountain
 Franklin Heights
 Kern Place
 La Guna
 Mission Hills
 Summit Place
 Sunset Heights

Neighborhood associations
Here is a list of some of the neighborhood associations in west central El Paso:

 El Paso High Neighborhood Association 
 Houston Park Neighborhood Association 
 Mission Hills Neighborhood Association 
 Rim Area Neighborhood Association 
 Sunset Heights Neighborhood Improvement Association

External links

 City of El Paso Website
 El Paso Neighborhood Associations

Geography of El Paso, Texas